Robbin Harms (born 9 June 1981 in Copenhagen) is a Danish motorcycle racer.

Career

125cc 
Harms first competed in the 125cc class in 1999 for Aprilia where he scored points in the season finale in Argentina.

He returned to the category in 2002, taking part in the Czech Grand Prix with a 23rd-place finish. His next seasons were in 2003 and 2004, in which he scored points in both.

Supersport 
He would race in the Supersport World Championship afterwards, from 2005 to 2011, where he scored a handful of podiums, including two-second places in the 2007 season.

British Superbikes 
Harms is currently a rider in the British Superbike Championship for Honda but has not been announced on the 2014 entry list. He first competed in the 2012 season where he finished 22nd in the championship with 24 points, with a best finish of ninth in the second race at TT Circuit Assen.

Career statistics

Grand Prix motorcycle racing

Races by year 
(key)

Supersport World Championship

Races by year

References

External links 
 Profile on MotoGP.com
 Profile on WorldSBK.com

1981 births
Living people
Sportspeople from Copenhagen
Danish motorcycle racers
125cc World Championship riders
Supersport World Championship riders